Richard Feynman (1918–1988) was a physicist.

Feynman may also refer to:
7495 Feynman, asteroid
 Foresight Institute Feynman Prize in Nanotechnology

Other people with the surname
 Joan Feynman (1927–2020), astrophysicist, sister of Richard

See also

 Feynmanium
 Feinman, a surname
 Fineman, a surname
 

Jewish surnames
Yiddish-language surnames